The Asia/Oceania Zone is one of the three zones of the regional Davis Cup competition in 1992.

In the Asia/Oceania Zone there are three different tiers, called groups, in which teams compete against each other to advance to the upper tier. Winners in Group II advanced to the Asia/Oceania Zone Group I. Teams who lost their respective ties competed in the relegation play-offs, with winning teams remaining in Group II, whereas teams who lost their play-offs were relegated to the Asia/Oceania Zone Group III in 1993.

Participating nations

Draw

 and  relegated  to Group III in 1993.
 promoted to Group I in 1993.

First round

Thailand vs. Singapore

Malaysia vs. Jordan

Sri Lanka vs. Bangladesh

Pakistan vs. Hong Kong

Second round

Malaysia vs. Thailand

Sri Lanka vs. Hong Kong

Relegation play-offs

Jordan vs. Singapore

Bangladesh vs. Pakistan

Third round

Hong Kong vs. Thailand

References

External links
Davis Cup official website

Davis Cup Asia/Oceania Zone
Asia Oceania Zone Group II